The Lāmi al-Darārī alā Jāmi al-Bukhārī is a collection of the unique remarks and observations on Sahih al-Bukhari presented by Shaykh Rashid Ahmad Gangohl. These lifelong acquired wisdoms were recorded by his student Shaykh Yahya Kandhlawl (Shaykh Zakariyya's father) during their lessons. Shaykh Zakariyya edited, arranged, and commented on his father's compilation, clarifying the text and adding a comprehensive introduction at the beginning.

Islamic theology books